Mathew Aaron "Matt" Scoggin (born August 17, 1963, in Saitama, Japan) is a retired diver from the United States. He competed for Team USA at the 1992 Summer Olympics, finishing in tenth place in the Men's 10m Platform event. Scoggin won a silver medal in the same event at the 1987 Pan American Games.

Since 1994, Scoggin has been the Diving Coach for his alma mater, the University of Texas.

He is often called one of the greatest diving coaches in the country.

See also
 List of University of Texas at Austin alumni
 Northern Virginia Swim League - Diving

References
 
 

1963 births
Living people
Divers at the 1992 Summer Olympics
Olympic divers of the United States
Texas Longhorns men's divers
American male divers
Pan American Games silver medalists for the United States
Pan American Games medalists in diving
Divers at the 1987 Pan American Games
Medalists at the 1987 Pan American Games